Berg Lake is a lake on the Robson River just below the river's source located within Mount Robson Provincial Park, at the doorstep of the north face of Mount Robson, the highest peak in the Canadian Rockies.  It is partly fed by the Berg Glacier.

The turquoise colored Berg Lake is dotted with icebergs even in the middle of summer. To reach the parking lot, follow Highway 5 north from Valemount to Highway 16 and head east .

Berg Lake Trail
The trail climbs gradually alongside the Robson River (a tributary of the Fraser River) for  before reaching Kinney Lake. After crossing a steel bridge at the end of Kinney Lake, it is just  to the Kinney Lake campground. After leaving the Kinney Lake campground the trail climbs and then descends a small bluff. After descending the bluff the trail splits for less than a kilometre, giving the hiker the option of traversing
the flats, which is not recommended in the early summer because of high water, or continuing on in the forest. At the end of the Kinney Lake flats the trail starts climbing up to the Valley of a Thousand Falls. After several kilometres the trail crosses the Robson River on a suspension bridge and enters Whitehorn campground at the  mark. After leaving the campground the trail eventually crosses a second steel bridge. At this point the trail starts a steep climb with numerous switchbacks. Over the next few kilometres, the trail passes White Falls, Falls-of-the-Pool and Emperor Falls. Finally, once above this valley, the trail levels off and dips down toward the river, providing the first glimpses of the Emperor Face of Mt. Robson. From here the trail continues on  until reaching the shores of Berg Lake and Marmot campground. If you carry on a further  you will reach Berg Lake campground. There are three popular day trips from this campground, Hargeaves Glacier/Mumm Basin Traverse, Toboggan Falls and Snowbird Pass. At the  mark and  mark there are two more campgrounds, Rearguard and Robson Pass.

See also
Robson Lake

References

Sources
The Canadian Rockies Trail Guide
K. Copeland, C. Copeland (2004). Don't Waste Your Time in the Canadian Rockies. Hikingcamping.com.

External links

Berg Lake Trail Trip Report. August 2004.
Google Maps view of trail, with markers
BC Parks Mount, Robson Provincial Park

Robson Valley
Canadian Rockies
Lakes of British Columbia
Mount Robson Provincial Park